Paul Gallister (born September 5, 1984 in Vienna) is an Austrian composer and music producer. 
He attended the University of Music and Performing Arts Vienna, where he received a Master of Arts in Media Composition.

Projects 

Gallister is a producer and composer for the Viennese band Wanda, as well as for Nino aus Wien, Playing Savage, Ansa Sauermann and PauT.
He co-orchestrated and programmed the winning song of the 2014 Eurovision Song Contest, Rise Like a Phoenix sung by Conchita Wurst and arranged multiple episodes of the TV series Dancing Stars and Die große Chance.

He also orchestrated several songs for the Swiss band Eluveitie’s album Helvetios.

Gallister wrote the title song for the TV series :de:/Das Glück dieser Erde, a show seen throughout Europe. He has written music for films and documentaries, including Putin's Games by Israeli director Alexander Gentelev, which received the German Television Award 2014 for Best Documentary, Dominik Hartl’s short film Spitzendeckchen, and for Hartl’s film Attack of the Lederhosen Zombies. With Matthias Weber, he won the award for Best Film Music at the 2015 Biarritz Film Festival for Weber's film "Beautiful Girl."
In 2017, he won the Austrian Film Award for Best Film Music for the film Die Mitte der Welt

Gallister co-wrote, with his Kollektiv Sound42 partner Lukas Hasitschka, the music for Tight Lines Fishing, which won the German Developer Award in 2011 for Best Social Game.

Gallister is a member of the Austrian Composer's Association and the International Society for Contemporary Music.

Filmography 
 2012: Spitzendeckchen
 2013: Putin's Games
 2015: Beautiful Girl
 2015: Turning Cold
 2015: Life:Patented
 2016: Karussell
 2016: Final Analysis
 2016: Attack of the Lederhosen Zombies
 2016: Die Mitte der Welt

Music Productions/Compositions 
 2012: Eluveitie - Helvetios
 2014: Wanda - Amore
 2015: Wanda - Bussi
 2016: Nino aus Wien - Adria
 2016: Playing Savage - Bigger
 2017: Nino aus Wien - Wach

Awards 
Paul Gallister's work has received a range of awards, including the Austrian Film Award for Best Film Music and multiple Amadeus Austrian Music Awards for Wanda and Nino aus Wien.

 2011: German Developer Award - Tight Lines Fishing
 2012: Joseph Haydn European Chamber Music Award for „Per Se”
 2015: Biarritz Film Festival – Best Film Music for "Beautiful Girl"
 2015: Amadeus Austrian Music Award – Best Alternative Pop/Rock and FM4 Radio People’s Choice Award (Wanda)
 2016: Amadeus Austrian Music Award – Best Pop/Rock, Best Live Act, Best Band (Wanda) and Best Alternative Pop/Rock (Nino aus Wien)
 2017: Austrian Film Award – Best Film Music (Die Mitte der Welt)

References

External links 
Official website

1984 births
Austrian film score composers
Composers from Vienna
Living people
University of Music and Performing Arts Vienna alumni